Marchiano is an Italian surname. Notable people with the surname include:

Bruce Marchiano (born 1956), American actor
Sal Marchiano (born 1941), American sportscaster
Sam Marchiano, American sportscaster, documentary filmmaker and activist

Italian-language surnames